Luboš Sluka (born on September 13, 1928 in Opočno) is a Czech Contemporary Composer.

Life and career
Lubos Sluka was admitted to Prague Conservatory where he completed his studies in three subjects - percussion, conducting and composition. In 1951, Sluka was chosen as Arthur Honegger's student, as well as George Auric's assistant. However, his stay in Paris has been cancelled due to political reasons. He graduated at the Academy of Performing Arts in Prague in composition with Jaroslav Řídký and Pavel Borkovec, film music with Václav Trojan in 1959.

From 1962 to 1963, he was employed as the program editor in Czech Television, from 1963 till 1969 he'd worked in the music publishing company Panton. In February 1992 was voted the chairman of the Society of composers and in January 1995 the chairman of the whole Association of musical artists and scientists of the Czech republic. Sluka's work is very complex and diverse (more than 350 compositions). He had also paid a great heed to vocal and vocal-symphonic compositions (8 song cycles, 5 cantatas), film and television productions (70 full-length films, 30 television productions, 3 musicals and 5 TV serials), as well as to orchestral music (80 pieces) and to so called popular music (80 compositions).

An asteroid 27978 Lubosluka is named after him.

Works
0001	Sonata per violoncello e pianoforte
0002	Sonata per fagotto e pianoforte
0003	Sonata per clarinetto basso e pianoforte
0004	Sonata per saxofono e pianoforte
0005	Sonata per pianoforte
0006	I. Quartetto d´archi (Partitura e parti)
0007	II. Quartetto d´archi (Partitura e parti)
0008	Miniature per Quartetto d´archi(Partitura e parti)
0009	Quartetto per flauto, violino, viola, violoncello (Partitura e parti)
0010	Sunset suite for string quartet (The second version for string quartet + contrabass)     (Partitura e parti)
0011	Suiete to the Memory of Jaroslav Ježek per due violoni, viola violoncello contarbasso (Partitura e parti)
0012	In Memory of Jaroslav Ježek per 5 violoncelli
0013	Nénie per 5 violoncelli (Partitura e parti)
0014	Quintetto per flauto, oboe, clarinetto, corno e fagotto (Infanzia) (Partitura e parti)
0015	II. Trio per violino, violoncello e pianoforte
0016	Racconto (Pohádka) per flauto, chitarra e violoncello
0017	Partita per tre flauti
0018	Pastorale per violino, viola e pianoforte
0019	Pastorale per violino, violoncello e pianoforte
0020	Pastorale per violino, clarinetto e pianoforte
0021	Pastorale per flauto, viola e pianoforte
0022	Pastorale per flauto, violoncello e pianoforte
0023	Pastorale per flauto, clarinetto e pianoforte
0024	Pastorale per clarinetto, viola e pianoforte
0025	Pastorale per clarinetto, violoncello e pianoforte
0026	Due pezzi per violino e pianoforte (Dva elegické kusy)
0027	Due notturni per  violoncello e pianoforte
0028	Gabbione per due usignuoli (Klec pro dva slavíky) per violoncello (fagotto ossia basclarinetto)e pianoforte
0029	Con animo per viloncello e pianoforte
0030	Con animo per fagotto e pianoforte
0031	Con animo per clarinetto basso e pianoforte
0032	Suita in G per oboe (ossia flauto e clarinetto) e pianoforte
0033	Tre composizioni per oboe (clarinetto) e pianoforte
0034	Tre composizioni per clarinetto basso e pianoforte
0035	Andante con moto per oboe e pianoforte
0036	Andante con moto per violoncello e pianoforte
0037	Andante con moto per fagotto e pianoforte
0038	Andante con moto per clarinetto basso e pianoforte
0039	Variazioni per pianoforte
0040	Ricapitolazioni per pianoforte
0041	Cesty pro varhany (Wege für Orgel – Ways for Organ)(Cesta stínu, Cesta ticha, Cesta uzdravení)
0042	Sonata per violino e pianoforte
0043	D-S-C-H per clarinettobasso e pianoforte
0044	D-S-C-H per violoncello e pianoforte
0045	D-S-C-H per contrabasso e pianoforte
0046	D-S-C-H per saxofono e pianoforte
0047	Malá klavírní suita - Kleine Klaviersuitte – Small Suitte for Piano
0048	Jaro a mládí – Frühling und Jugend – Spring and Youth - Suite per pianoforte
0049	Hry a sny – Spiele und Träume – Games and Dreams per pianoforte
0050	Hrátky - Plauderstündchen – Amusements per pianoforte
0051	Chvilky u klavíru – Kurzweil am Klavier – Moments at the Piano
0052	Klavírní brevíř pro mladé i starší pianisty – Klavierbrevier für kleine und grosse    Pianisten – Piano Breviary for young and older Pianists
0053	Suita piccola per chitarra
0054	Duettini per due violoncelli
0055	Duettini per flauto (flauto a becco, clarinetto ossia violino) e fagotto (ossia      violoncello) - ossia pianoforte solo
0056	Suita in G per oboe e archi (Partitura)
0057	Serenati per orchestra d´archi (Partitura)
0058	Ricordo (Vzpomínka) per grande orchestra (Partitura)
0059	Oravská balada, poema sinfonico (Partitura)
0060	Via della guarigione (Cesta uzdravení), meditazione sinfonico (Partitura)
0061	Vejménu života, kantáta pro mužský sbor, recitátora, a symfonický orchestr – In Namen des Lebens, Kantate für Männerchor, Sprecher und Sinfonieorchester (Text S.K.Neumann)(Partitura)
0062	LIALA, Valzer di concerto per violino
a)	e grande orchestra (Partitura)
b)	per violino e pianoforte
0063	Suita per grande orchestra (Partitura)
0064	Vyznání, monolog pro hluboký hlas a smyčce na slova Michelangela Buonarrotiho v překladu Jana Vladislava Die Konfession für tiefe Stimme und Streichorchester auf Worte des Michelangelo Buonarroti Freie deutsche Nachdichtung von Helena Medková
a)	pro hluboký hlas a smyčcový orchestr (Partitura) - für tiefe Stimme und Streichorchestr (Partitura)
b)	pro hluboký hlas a varhany - für tiefe Stimme und Orgel
c)	pro střední hlas a varhany - für mittlere Stimme und Orgel
0065	Beránci a beránky, hrátky pro dětský sbor, sóla, pastýře (recitace) a komorní orchestr na slova Václava Fischera (Partitura e parti)
0066	Zpíváno dětem, cyklus písní pro vyšší hlas
a)	a klavír na slova J.V.Sládka - Kindern gesungen, Liederzyklus für höhere Stimme und klavier Deutsche Übersetzung von Adolf Langer
b)	pro dvouhlasý dětský sbor a klavír - für Kindernchor (2-3 Stimmen) und Klavier Deutsche Übersetzung von Adolf Langer
0067	Radosti není nikdy dost, kantáta pro dětský sbor a klavír na slova Vladimíra Šefla(Partitura e parti)
0068	Praha – Tokio, kantáta pro dětský sbor a klavír na slova Václava Fischera (Partitura e     parti)
0069	Čekání na Ježíška pro dětský nebo ženský sbor, klarinet a klavír na slova Václava Fischera
0070	Šest písní na slova moravské lidové poezie pro vyšší hlas a klavír – Sechs Lieder nach mährischer Volkspoesie für höhere Stimme und Klavier
0071	Tři písně na slova švédské lidové poezie  pro baryton a klavír – Drei schwedische        Lieder für Bariton und Klavier
0072	Písně renesanční pro střední hlas a klavír (Angelo Poliziano, Tarquato Tasso,	Michelangelo Buonarroti v překladu Jana Vladislava) – Rennaissancelieder für mittlere Stimme und Klavier (Angelo Poliziano, Tarquato Tasso, Michelangelo Buonarroti) Deutsche Übersetzung von Bedřich Eben
0073	Tři zpěvy pro střední hlas a klavír (J.W.von Goethe, Otakar Theer, Vladimír Kučera)–       Drei Gesänge für mittlere Stimme und Klavier (J.W.von Goethe, Otakar Theer,Vladimír Kučera)
0074	Květomluva, cyklus písní pro střední hlas a klavír na slova Roberta Desnose ve volném      přebásnění Kamila Bednáře – Blumensprache, Liederzyklus für mittlere Stimme und Klavier nach Versen von Robert Desnos.Freie deutsche Nachdichtung zur gegebenen Music von Adolf Langer
0075	Kladské písně a balady – Lieder und Balladen aus Glatz
a)	pro střední hlas a klavír, für mittlere Stimme und klavier
b)	pro hluboký hlas a klavír, für tiefere Stimme und Klavier
0076	Na konci tisíciletí, tři smíšené sbory na slova českých básníků (V. Závada,     F.Nechvátal, K.Bednář)
0077	Návraty – Rückkehren – Returns – Ritorni – 8 composizioni i per pianoforte
0078	Devatero – Nove composizioni per pianoforte
0079	Vigilie per organo
0080	Slavíček v keřku spievá – Die Nachtigall singt im Gebüsch – Nightingale in the Sky – composizioni per flauto a becco (ad lib.flauto piccolo, flauto, oboe, clarinetto, violino)e pianoforte
0081	4 Ave Maria per canto e organo e O sanctissima per canto, violino e organo
0082	Canti (Zpěvy) per tromba e organo
0083	Due valzeri per pianoforte
0084	Jako tehdy, 8 písní pro mezzosoprán a klavír - Wie damals, 8 Lieder für Mezzosopran und Klavier
0085	Bezový keř, 11písní pro baryton a klavír – Holunderstrauch, 11 Lieder für Bariton 	und Klavier
0086	Suite to the Memory of Jaroslav Ježek per due violoncelli e pianoforte
0087	2 Pange lingua per coro misto
0088	III. Quartetto d´archi (Partitura e parti)
0089	IV. Quartetto d´archi (Partitura e parti)
0090	Sonata per viola e pianoforte
0091	Trio per flauto, violoncello e pianoforte
0092	Samota (Solitudine – Einsamkeit – Solitude)
a)	per violino e orchestra d´archi
b)	per violino e pianoforte
c)	per violoncello e pianoforte
0093	Suite to the Memory of Jaroslav Ježek
a)	per flauto, violino, violoncello e pianoforte
b)	per orchestra d´archi (Partitura e parti)
c)	per pianoforte
0094	Lento affabile per grande orchestra d´archi(Partitura e parti)
0095	Consonanza con Mozart per violino ossia flauto e pianoforte
0096	Svou káru táhnu za sebou – tři šansony pro střední hlas a klavír na básně Jiřího        Sternwalda
0097	Sonatine per pianoforte
0098	Suite in modo classico per arpa ossia clavicemballo
0099	Quartetto per 4 flauti
0100	Sinfonietta per archi (Partitura e parti)
0101	Dvě velikonoční písně pro střední hlas a klavír
0102	Amoroso
a)	per pianoforte
b)	per violino ossia violoncello e pianoforte
c)	per violino, violoncello ossia fagotto e pianoforte
0103	Missa Neratovensis per coro misto, soli e organo (Partitura e parti)
0104	Vidi aquam per coro misto e organo
0105	Tři ženské sbory
0106	Toccata per pianoforte

External links 
 Musica.cz

Czech composers
Czech male composers
People from Opočno
1928 births
Living people